Angela Poppy is a former England women's international footballer. Poppy's greatest achievement was scoring winning the 1982 Women's FA Cup with Lowestoft Ladies F.C..

International career

Poppy made her England debut in 1976 against Wales, and won a further 4 additional caps.

Honours
Lowestoft Ladies F.C. 
 FA Women's Cup: 1982

References

1953 births
Living people
Lowestoft Ladies F.C. players
English women's footballers
England women's international footballers
Women's association footballers not categorized by position